Elbrussky District is an administrative and a municipal district (raion), one of the ten in the Kabardino-Balkar Republic, Russia. It is located in the western and southwestern parts of the republic. Its administrative center is the town of Tyrnyauz. As of the 2010 Census, the total population of the district was 36,260, with the population of Tyrnyauz accounting for 57.9% of that number.

Administrative and municipal status
Within the framework of administrative divisions, Elbrussky District is one of the ten in the Kabardino-Balkar Republic and has administrative jurisdiction over one town (Tyrnyauz) and ten rural localities. As a municipal division, the district is incorporated as Elbrussky Municipal District. The town of Tyrnyauz is incorporated as an urban settlement and the ten rural localities are incorporated into six rural settlements within the municipal district. The town of Tyrnyauz serves as the administrative center of both the administrative and municipal district.

References

Notes

Sources

Districts of Kabardino-Balkaria
